2000 Egypt Cup Final, was the final match of the 1999–2000 Egypt Cup, when Ismaily played Al Mokawloon Al Arab at Cairo International Stadium in Cairo.

Ismaily won the game 4–0, claiming the cup for the 2nd time.

Route to the final

Game description

Match details

External links
 https://www.youtube.com/watch?v=ZeeYCP6pMrU

2000
Cup Final
Egypt Cup
Egypt Cup